Statistics of Swiss Super League in the 1941–42 season.

Overview
The Nationalliga was contested by 14 teams and in this season it ended in a heat, because two teams ended the season equal on points. Thus a play-off was required, between the Grasshopper Club Zürich and FC Grenchen. The first game ended 0–0 in Bern, the second game ended 1–1 in Basel. The championship title awarded to GC on goal average. The 1st League was contested by 25 teams, these were divided into two groups. There were twelve teams contesting in group East and thirteen in group West. The winner of each group had to play a play-off for promotion to the Nationalliga. Basel finished their season as winners of group East and the play-offs were then against group West winners Bern, the away tie ending with a goalless draw and Basel won their home tie 3–1 to achieve Promotion.

Nationalliga standings

Results

League standings 1st League group East

League standings 1st League group West

Promotion play-off

Basel won 3–1 on aggregate

Sources 
 Rotblau: Jahrbuch Saison 2014/2015. Publisher: FC Basel Marketing AG. 
 Switzerland 1941–42 at RSSSF

Swiss Football League seasons
Swiss
Nationalliga